The DVD Copy Control Association (DVD CCA) is an organization primarily responsible for the copy protection of DVDs. The Content Scramble System (CSS) was devised for this purpose to make copyright infringement difficult, but also presents obstacles to some legitimate uses of the media. The association is also responsible for the controversial Regional Playback Control (RPC), the region encoding scheme which gives movie studios geographic control over DVD distribution.

As of 2001, members included film distributors such as Metro-Goldwyn-Mayer, Twentieth Century Fox and Warner Bros.

They filed the much publicized case versus Jon Johansen who they alleged wrote DeCSS. The case was dropped in January 2004. CSS decrypting software (such as DVD Decrypter, AnyDVD, and DVD Shrink) allows a region-specific DVD to be copied as an all-region DVD. It also removes Macrovision, CSS, region codes, and user operation prohibitions. They also filed the suit DVD CCA v. Bunner against people who distributed DeCSS, seeking injunctions to stop further distribution based on trade secret claims. The injunction was eventually denied because CSS was no longer a secret by the time litigation occurred.

Features restricted by manufacturers
All hardware manufacturers (especially DVD player/burner manufacturers) implement DVD CCA-mandated enforcement features on their products as RPC (which is one of three restrictions in the Content Scramble System); some even go beyond that and implement additional features to restrict ripping, for example:
 RIPLOCK: many manufacturers put an artificial limit, or lock, on ripping speeds. Some of these drives have alternative 3rd-party firmware that have this removed to enable faster ripping. See the RPC-1 Firmware Site for example.
 Bitsetting/Booktyping: this is a feature which makes DVD+Rs readable by older DVD players that can play DVD-ROMS only. Some manufacturers disable this feature on their drives. Again, some alternative 3rd-party firmware can enable this so that burned DVDs appear as DVD-ROMs and are playable by older DVD players.

See also
 Blu-ray region code
 Blu-ray, the successor of DVD
 DVD Copy Control Ass'n, Inc. v. Bunner
 Universal City Studios, Inc. v. Reimerdes
 DVD Copy Control Ass'n, Inc. v. Kaleidescape, Inc.
 RealNetworks, Inc. v. DVD Copy Control Ass'n, Inc.

References

External links
 DVD CCA

 
Arts and media trade groups
Technology trade associations
Hardware restrictions
Compact Disc and DVD copy protection